Cityscape is a residential neighbourhood in the northeast quadrant of Calgary, Alberta, Canada. It is bounded by Métis Trail to the west, Country Hills Boulevard to the north, the future 60 Street NE extension to the east, and the future Airport Trail NE (96 Avenue NE) extension to the south. Country Hills Boulevard becomes Highway 564 as it exits Calgary to the east.

Cityscape is located within Calgary City Council's Ward 3.

See also 
List of neighbourhoods in Calgary

References 

Neighbourhoods in Calgary